Stattena IF is a Swedish football club located in Helsingborg. The club played two seasons in the Allsvenskan in 1927–28 and 1929–30.

Background
The original club Stattena was one of the two clubs which in 1907 formed Helsingborgs IF. The present club was re-formed on 24 March 1922 and the ladies section was added in 1971.

The club was founded as a local neighborhood team from the Stattena district in Helsingborg. Originally a village, which was located outside the city (Old Danish place name; Statene, meaning "stand alone", i.e. solitary villages or houses), which probably contributed to the historical, local patriotic rivalry with HIF.

Since their foundation Stattena IF's men's team has participated in the upper and lower divisions of the Swedish football league system.  In their early years the club played in the Allsvenskan for two seasons in 1927–28 and 1929–30. They play their home matches at the Olympiafältet in Helsingborg. The team colours today are blue and white, but historically blue and yellow striped shirts and blue shorts. The kit were later taken over by local competitor Eskilsminne IF. Eskilsminne previously played in a light and dark purple-striped shirt and white shorts.

When Stattena played in the best tier Allsvenskan in the 1920s and 1930s, they had an almost Southern European support group, who watched the training sessions, lively discussed lineups etc at the beer cafes, and met the team at the train station when they returned to Helsingborg after away matches. Unfortunately, opposing supporters were also hit by a rain of beer bottles, which were thrown at them. When the star player and future national team player Knut Kroon was sold from Stattena to arch-rival HIF, he could barely show up in town.

When Stattena played the Allsvenskan Helsingborg derby against HIF at the Olympia season 1929/30, and Di Röe got a penalty kick, penalty taker Axel "Massa" Alfredsson uttered the winged words, which illustrate the rivalry between the teams, despite HIF becoming champions and Stattena got relegated: "I put hatred behind the ball. Stattena has got to lose!"

Five years after their formation, in 1971, the ladies team climbed to the Damallsvenskan.  More recently the team has played at the same level in 2003, 2004 and 2009.

Stattena IF are affiliated to the Skånes Fotbollförbund. The club is a member of the Helsingborgs Fotbollsklubbars Allians (Helsingborg Football Club Alliance) and has 900 members with 20 youth teams comprising 11 boys teams and 9 girls teams. The club also cooperates with Filbornaskolan to provide top-level female players with the opportunity to combine football development with a four-year secondary education.

Season to season

Men's team

In their early history Stattena IF competed in the following divisions:

In recent seasons Stattena IF have competed in the following divisions:

* League restructuring in 2006 resulted in a new division being created at Tier 3 and subsequent divisions dropping a level.

Ladies Team

Notable players
  Anders Linderoth
  Knut Kroon
  Pia Sundhage
  Caroline Seger
  Erla Steina Arnardóttir
  Nancy Augustyniak Goffi

Footnotes

External links
 Stattena IF – Official website

Football clubs in Skåne County
Football in Helsingborg
Women's football clubs in Sweden
Allsvenskan clubs
Association football clubs established in 1922
1922 establishments in Sweden